Caravan Bridge is an ancient bridge in the city of İzmir, Turkey. It was built in approximately 850 BC over the Meles river, and is one of the oldest man-made structures in continuous use. In antiquity, the River Meles was said to be the birthplace of Homer, and both the river and the bridge was featured in Homer's work.

References

Buildings and structures in İzmir
Bridges in Turkey
Bridges completed in the 9th century BC